is a remake of the Game Boy Color role-playing video game, Tales of Phantasia: Narikiri Dungeon, for the PlayStation Portable developed by Namco Tales Studio and published by Namco Bandai. It released in Japan on August 5, 2010. The original game was the first sequel in the Tales series, which normally does not have connected storylines. The story begins 205 years after the beginning of Tales of Phantasia.

In addition the game also includes a separate game, pronounced Tales of Phantasia Cross, which is the fourth remake of the first game in the series Tales of Phantasia.

Gameplay

Both games utilize the Cross Arts Aerial Linear Motion Battle System (XAR-LMBS) which is a tweaked version of the series' Linear Motion Battle System which is used in almost every game in the series though each game features its own unique version of the LMBS. Battles take place in a 3D environment with 2D character sprites. The two main characters of the game Dio and Mel can change into any of the clothes they are given, depending on the clothes the characters can change skills and obtain certain equipment. For example, Dio can change into Samurai and Shinobi clothes while Mel can change into Nurse and Witch clothes. The game features a total of about 80 costumes.

Characters

Narikiri Dungeon X
Dio (Mitsuki Saiga)
One of the Narikiri twins. He is carefree and optimistic.
Mel (Kana Asumi)
One of the Narikiri twins. She is more level-headed and mature.
Etos (Yukari Tamura)
A fairy from another world. She is the adoptive mother of Dio and Mel.
Norn (Miki Itoh)
A spirit who entrusted the twins to Etos.
Albert (Naoki Tatsuta)
A talking wardrobe sent by Norn to keep outfits for the twins. He adores Mel but argues with Dio.
Kruelle (Miki Itoh)
A weird creature that Dio and Mel saved from a monster. It is able to change its form and has high fighting power.
Rondoline E. Effenberg (Eri Kitamura)
A free-spirited time-traveler who wants to alter history. Her sporadic travels through time intersect with events in Tales of Phantasia: Cross Edition, where she appears as a guest party member.

Phantasia X
Cress Albane (Takeshi Kusao)
A swordsman who seeks the answer as to what "true justice" really is, he uses his family's Albane Style swordsmanship.
Mint Adenade (Junko Iwao)
A healer whose weakness is not being able to heal the hearts of others; this often bothers her.
Arche Klein (Mika Kanai)
A half-elf who is extremely playful and likes to tease others. Due to her being a half-elf she has a long life which leads to her being left behind by others making her feel lonely.
Claus F. Lester (Kazuhiko Inoue)
A summoner from ancient Euclid.
Chester Burklight (Kentaro Ito)
Childhood friend of Cress who was thought to be killed early in the story. The party recruits him later on at a low level.
Suzu Fujbayashi (Taeko Kawata)
A ninja and current chief of Ninja Village.

Development
The game was originally teased on March 3, 2010 in the Japanese magazine, Jump. It was officially unveiled in the March 10, 2010 issue of Jump. Prior to that Japanese illustrator, Kazuyoshi Nagiyuma, who previously worked on Tales of Vesperia said that he had just finished doing illustrations for Tales of Phantasia: Narikiri Dungeon R, which has been presumably renamed to Tales of Phantasia: Narikiri Dungeon X.

References

External links
Official Site

2010 video games
PlayStation Portable games
PlayStation Portable-only games
Video game remakes
Phantasia, Tales of
Video game sequels
Japan-exclusive video games
Bandai Namco video game compilations
Video games developed in Japan
Video games scored by Motoi Sakuraba